is a junction railway station in the town of  Ōishida, Yamagata, Japan, operated by East Japan Railway Company (JR East).

Lines
Ōishida Station is served by the Ōu Main Line and the Yamagata Shinkansen, with direct high-speed Tsubasa services to and from Tokyo. It is located 126.9 rail kilometers from the terminus of both lines at Fukushima Station.

Station layout
The station has two opposed side platforms connected to the station building by a footbridge. The station has a Midori no Madoguchi staffed ticket office.

Platforms

History
Ōishida Station opened on 21 October 1901. The privately owned Obanazawa Railroad connected to the station from 1926 until its abandonment in 1970. A new station building was completed in 1983. The station was absorbed into the JR East network upon the privatization of JNR on 1 April 1987. The Yamagata Shinkansen began operations on 4 December 1999.

Passenger statistics
In fiscal 2018, the station was used by an average of 792 passengers daily (boarding passengers only).

Surrounding area
 Ōishida Town Hall
 Ōishida Post Office
 Mogami River
 Ginzan Onsen

See also
List of railway stations in Japan

References

External links

 JR East Station information 

Railway stations in Yamagata Prefecture
Stations of East Japan Railway Company
Yamagata Shinkansen
Ōu Main Line
Railway stations in Japan opened in 1901
Ōishida, Yamagata